2016 in Bellator MMA was the eighth year in the history of Bellator MMA, a mixed martial arts promoter based in the United States. Bellator held 23 events in 2016.

Background
2016 is notable for the launch of sibling promotion Bellator Kickboxing, which would debut on the night of Bellator 152 on April 16 and be taped for broadcast on Spike TV on April 22.

Bellator 148

Bellator 148: Daley vs. Uhrich  took place January 29, 2016 at the Save Mart Center in Fresno, California. The event aired live in prime time on Spike TV.

Background

The main event was a Welterweight fight between Paul Daley and Andy Uhrich.

The event was expected to be headlined by a welterweight bout between UFC veteran Josh Koscheck and Matt Secor. However Koscheck pulled out of the bout due to an injury. As a result, Paul Daley vs. Andy Uhrich was elevated to the main event

Also on the card Paul Bradley faced Chris Honeycutt in a rematch. Bradley and Honeycutt first squared off at Bellator 140, where their bout ended in a no contest in the second round due to an accidental clash of heads opening a cut on Bradley that forced a stoppage.

Results

Bellator 149

Bellator 149: Shamrock vs. Gracie III took place February 19, 2016 at the Toyota Center in Houston, Texas. The event aired live in prime time on Spike TV, drawing an average 2.0 million viewers.

Background

The main event and co-main event of Bellator 149 were announced on the air during Bellator 145. President Scott Coker announced the main event fight would feature trilogy bout between combat sports legends Ken Shamrock and Royce Gracie.  Gracie initially beat Shamrock in fifty-seven seconds via rear-naked choke at their first meeting at UFC 1 in 1993.  Subsequent to that bout, the duo fought to a thirty-six minute draw at UFC 5 in 1995.

The co-main event featured a heavyweight bout between former Miami-Dade County street fighters Kevin Ferguson, aka "Kimbo Slice" and Dhafir Harris, aka "Dada 5000"

During intermission after the Kimbo Slice vs. Dada 5000 fight and shortly before the Ken Shamrock vs. Royce Gracie bout, Bellator MMA ring announcer Michael C. Williams announced to the live Toyota Center crowd attendance of 14,209. Thus making Bellator 149 the largest attended show in Bellator MMA history, beating out Bellator MMA & Glory: Dynamite 1 previous live attendance of 11,732.

Following the event it was announced that both Ken Shamrock and Kimbo Slice had failed their pre-fight drug tests. Shamrock tested positive for the anabolic steroid nandrolone, the opioid methadone, and an elevated (T/E) ratio of 12.4:1. Meanwhile, Slice also tested positive for nandrolone and having an elevated (T/E) ratio of 6.4:1. The maximum allowed (T/E) ratio by both the Texas Department of Licensing and Regulation and the World Anti-Doping Agency is 4:1. On May 2, 2016, it was revealed that Slice had settled with the Texas Athletic Commission with a fine of $2,500 and a revoking of his license in the state of Texas. The result of the bout has also been changed to a no contest.

Results

Bellator 150

Bellator 150: Kongo vs. Spartan took place February 26, 2016 at the Kansas Star Casino in Mulvane, Kansas. The event aired live in prime time on Spike TV.

Background

The event was expected to be headlined by a rematch between Marcos Galvão and Eduardo Dantas for the Bellator Bantamweight Championship.  The bantamweight title rematch was originally scheduled for Bellator 144, but was postponed when Dantas was forced to withdraw after suffering a rib injury in training. Dantas defeated Galvão via second-round knockout in their first meeting at Bellator 89 when “Dudu” was the promotion's reigning 135-pound champ.  However, due to an illness throughout the week leading to the fight, Galvão was pulled from the card the day of the weigh ins.

The co-main event featured local favorite David Rickels facing off against Bobby Cooper.

Results

Bellator 151

Bellator 151: Warren vs. Caldwell took place March 4, 2016 at the WinStar World Casino in Thackerville, Oklahoma. The event aired live in prime time on Spike TV.

Background

The event was headlined by an Bantamweight bout between Joe Warren and undefeated rising star Darrion Caldwell.  A former two-division champion, Warren has won six of his last seven fights in Bellator MMA. The 39-year-old last appeared at Bellator 143 on Sept. 25, when he captured a unanimous verdict against L.C. Davis.  The 27-year-old Caldwell is 8-0 in his burgeoning career, including five triumphs under the Bellator banner. In his last outing, the former NCAA national champion wrestler choked out Shawn Bunch inside of a round at Bellator 143.

Michael Page was originally scheduled to face Fernando Gonzalez at this event but was pulled out of the bout in early February 2016.  He was replaced by Resurrection Fighting Alliance welterweight champion Gilbert Smith.

Results

Bellator 152

Bellator 152: Italy took place April 16, 2016 at the Pala Alpitour in Torino, Italy. The event aired on Spike TV.

Background

The event was announced in Paris by Bellator MMA President Scott Coker joined by Oktagon Kickboxing President Carlo Di Blasi a co-promoted event set to take place on April 16 at the Pala Alpitour in Torino, Italy.

Bellator 152 was followed by "Bellator Kickboxing: Torino”, the debut event of Bellator Kickboxing. The event would be televised on Friday, April 22 on Spike TV, following their broadcast of Bellator 153.

Results

Bellator 153

Bellator 153: Koreshkov vs. Henderson took place April 22, 2016 at the Mohegan Sun Arena  in Uncasville, Connecticut. The event aired live in prime time on Spike TV.

Background

The event was headlined by a Welterweight Championship match between current champion Andrey Koreshkov and former UFC and WEC lightweight champion Benson Henderson. The 32-year-old Henderson recently ended a 14-fight run with the UFC by signing a multi-fight deal with Bellator MMA. A longtime 155-pounder, Henderson recorded back-to-back wins as a welterweight in 2015. Also on the card is the Bellator debut of Evangelista Santos taking on long time contender Brennan Ward.

Former Bellator Featherweight Champion Patrício Pitbull was originally scheduled to face John Macapá. who had to pull out of the evening's co-feature bout with a broken rib.

Results

Bellator 154

Bellator 154: Davis vs. King Mo is a mixed martial arts event held on May 14, 2016 at the SAP Center in San Jose, California, USA. The event was aired live in prime time on Spike TV.

Background

Davis vs. King Mo was announced during Bellator 149 in Houston. The two men were supposed to face each other in the finals of the Bellator MMA & Glory: Dynamite 1 light heavyweight one-night tournament back in September, but "King Mo" sustained a hip injury after winning in the first round. Former UFC star Phil Davis won the tournament at Dynamite by submitting Emanuel Newton and knocked out reserve fighter Francis Carmont.  Davis was originally scheduled to challenge light heavyweight champion Liam McGeary, but McGeary was injured.  Lawal won the two-night, eight-man tournament at Rizin Fighting Federation on New Year's Eve in Japan. He knocked out Brett McDermott in the first round, beat Teodoras Aukstuolis in the semifinals by unanimous decision and knocked out Jiri Prochazka in the final. The winner of the main event will challenge for the title against the current champion.

Former Bellator Lightweight Champion Michael Chandler was scheduled to face former Strikeforce Lightweight Champion Josh Thomson in a lightweight bout.  However, on May 2, it was announced that Thomson pulled out of the bout due to an undisclosed injury.  As a result, Chandler was pulled from the card altogether.

Jordan Parsons was scheduled to face Adam Piccolotti in a featherweight bout on this card.  That fight was cancelled after Parsons was involved in a hit-and-run accident that left him hospitalized before he died on May 4, 2016.

Sergei Kharitonov was scheduled to make his debut on this card against Josh Appelt.  However, on May 11, Kharitonov withdrew from the bout due to illness.  As a result, Appelt was also removed from the card.

Darren Uyenoyama was scheduled to fight on this card against Alvin Cacdac but required medical testing revealed a condition that would not allow Darren to compete.

Results

Bellator 155

Bellator 155: Carvalho vs Manhoef took place May 20, 2016 at the CenturyLink Arena in Boise, Idaho. The event aired live in prime time on Spike TV.

Background

The event was headlined by a match between Rafael Carvalho and Melvin Manhoef for the Bellator Middleweight Championship.  Carvalho pulled off one of 2015's biggest upsets when he finished Brandon Halsey with a body kick in the second round to claim the Middleweight title at Bellator 144 last October. The Brazilian has not lost since his MMA debut in 2011 and has stopped 10 of his last 12 opponents.  Manhoef earned his shot at the title by knocking out Hisaki Kato in the opening round at Bellator 146.

The co-main event featured former Bellator Featherweight Championship Champion Pat Curran facing off against former World Series of Fighting featherweight champion Georgi Karakhanyan.

This event was scheduled to crown the inaugural Bellator women's featherweight champion in a bout between Marloes Coenen and Julia Budd. However, Budd was injured and replaced by Alexis Dufresne thus changing the fight to a non-title bout.

A preliminary bout between Ricky Steele and Eric Cronkhite was cancelled after Cronkhite missed weight by 9 pounds.

Results

Bellator 156

Bellator 156: Galvao vs. Dantas 2 took place on June 17, 2016 at the Save Mart Center in Fresno, California. The event aired live in prime time on Spike TV.

Background

Marcos Galvão made the first defense of his Bellator Bantamweight Championship title against Eduardo Dantas.  The rematch was originally scheduled for Bellator 150, but was scrapped following a last-minute illness suffered by Galvão. Both fighters cut their teeth with André Pederneiras’ Nova Uniao squad in Rio de Janeiro, until their paths crossed at Bellator 89. Dantas won the fight via a second-round knockout.  Dantas went on to defend the title against Anthony Leone before losing it to Joe Warren at Bellator 128.  In turn, Galvão pieced together three consecutive victories and then defeated Warren via second-round technical submission to become the new champion.

Douglas Lima was originally scheduled to face Chidi Njokuani, but was pulled from this bout when he got the call to headline Bellator 158 in London against Paul Daley due to an injury that forced Josh Koscheck out of that match up. 
 
Results

Bellator 157

Bellator 157: Dynamite 2 was held on June 24, 2016 at the Scottrade Center in St. Louis, Missouri The event aired live in prime time on Spike TV .

Background

The event was headlined by a heavyweight bout between former UFC light heavyweight champion Quinton Jackson and Japanese Olympic gold medalist Satoshi Ishii. Jackson had a successful three-fight stint with Bellator MMA - two knockouts against Joey Beltran and Christian M'Pumbu plus a unanimous decision won over Muhammed Lawal - before returning to the UFC where he defeated Fabio Maldonado via unanimous decision at UFC 186. After facing Maldonado, a contract settlement brought Jackson back to Bellator MMA. A 2008 Olympic gold medalist in judo, Ishii began his MMA career in December 2009 and has competed against fighters such as Fedor Emelianenko, Mirko Cro Cop, Jerome Le Banner, and Tim Sylvia.

In the co-main event, former Bellator Lightweight Champion Michael Chandler took on top contender Patricky Freire for the vacant Bellator Lightweight Championship.

Like the previous Dynamite card, the show combined MMA and kickboxing bouts with a cage and ring set up side-by-side.  Bellator Kickboxing: St. Louis - which featured a rematch between Joe Schilling and Hisaki Kato under kickboxing rules - aired immediately following the Dynamite 2 portion on Spike TV.

Results

Bellator 158

Bellator 158: Daley vs. Lima (aka Bellator: London) was held on July 16, 2016 at the O2 Arena (London) in London. The event had a tape-delayed broadcast on Spike TV and Channel 5 (UK).

Background

Originally, Bellator President Scott Coker announced that Kimbo Slice and James Thompson would compete in the main event of Bellator 158, to take place July 16 at London's O2 Arena.  This was to be a rematch of their infamous 2008 clash under the EliteXC banner which ended in a controversial TKO win for Kimbo. Tragically these plans had to be scrapped, as Slice died suddenly on June 6, 2016 of heart failure.

Josh Koscheck was scheduled to make his debut on this card against Paul Daley. However, Koscheck withdrew from the bout and was replaced by Douglas Lima.

Fernando Gonzalez was supposed to fight Michael Page but visa issues forced him off the card and was replaced by Evangelista Santos.

Contractual issues with ATAK Promotions caused Mark Godbeer and Ben Smith to withdraw from the card.

Linton Vassell was supposed to fight Francis Carmont but a cut over his left eye forced him to withdraw and be replaced by Lukasz Klinger.

The Mohegan Department of Athletic Regulation was responsible for drug testing at this event and marks the first time that Bellator had a US-based athletic commission exercise regulatory powers abroad.

Results

Bellator 159

Bellator 159: Caldwell vs. Taimanglo was held on July 22, 2016 at the Kansas Star Arena in Mulvane, Kansas. The event aired live in prime time on Spike TV.

Background

The event was headlined by a bantamweight title eliminator bout between Darrion Caldwell and Joe Taimanglo. The winner is expect to face the current bantamweight champion Eduardo Dantas.  Originally set at bantamweight, the fight was switched to a catchweight when Taimanglo weighed in at 138 pounds.

In the co-main event, local fighter Dave Rickels met Melvin Guillard.  It was originally scheduled to be a lightweight bout, but Guillard missed weight and came in at 157.9 pounds.

Results

Bellator 160

Bellator 160: Henderson vs. Pitbull  was held on August 26, 2016 at the Honda Center in Anaheim, California. The event aired live in prime time on Spike TV.

Background 

The event was headlined by a Lightweight title eliminator fight between former UFC champion Benson Henderson and former Bellator featherweight champion Patrício Pitbull. Henderson, after being defeated in his April debut against welterweight champion Andrey Koreshkov, returned to the division where he twice defeated Frankie Edgar. He has also beaten former UFC title challengers Nate Diaz and Donald Cerrone. Pitbull sought to parlay the victory to a title shot against lightweight champion Michael Chandler, who claimed the belt by knocking out Pitbull's brother, Patricky, on June 24.

Due to pressure from fans the feature prelim was moved back to being the co-main even on the card featuring NCAA Division I National Champion in Wrestling Bubba Jenkins versus Georgi Karakhanyan. The last time these two met Karakhanyan defeated Jenkins by guillotine choke in the first round.

Additionally, four-time NCAA Division II Champion wrestler Joey Davis made his professional MMA debut on this card; as an amateur he had a record of 5-0. Davis recently graduated from Notre Dame College, where he accumulated an undefeated 131-0 record over the course of four seasons during his collegiate wrestling career. He is the only Division II wrestler in NCAA history to win four consecutive national titles, and is one of three wrestlers ever to complete a four-year college career with an undefeated record.

Kevin Ferguson Jr., the eldest son of Kimbo Slice, was scheduled to make his Bellator debut on this card against Jonathan Tomasian. However, the bout was cancelled on August 21 due to an injury received by Ferguson.

Results

Bellator 161

Bellator 161: Kongo vs. Johnson  was held on September 16, 2016 at the H-E-B Center at Cedar Park in Cedar Park, Texas. The event aired live in prime time on Spike TV.

Background 

The event was headlined by a heavyweight fight between former UFC veteran Cheick Kongo and Tony Johnson. Kongo was currently riding a two-fight winning streak over Vinicius Queiroz and Alexander Volkov. Kongo also owns wins against Shawn Jordan, Matt Mitrione, Pat Barry and Mirko Filipovic. The bout was Kongo's third consecutive Bellator headliner slot. Meanwhile, Johnson boasted a three-fight winning streak, including a pair of victories under the Bellator banner – a January win over Raphael Butler and an April 2015 win over Volkov. Johnson also owns wins against UFC contender Derrick Lewis and former UFC champion Tim Sylvia.

Results

Bellator Kickboxing 3

Bellator Kickboxing 3  was held on September 17, 2016 at the Syma Hall in Budapest, Hungary. The event aired on tape delay on September 23, 2016 in prime time on Spike TV.

Background 

The event was headlined by a Bellator Kickboxing welterweight title fight between Karim Ghajji and Zoltán Laszák. Ghajji had previously won the title in his Bellator debut with a split decision victory over Mustapha Haida at Bellator 152.

Results

Bellator 162

Bellator 162: Shlemenko vs. Grove  was held on October 21, 2016 at the FedEx Forum in Memphis, Tennessee. The event aired live in prime time on Spike TV.

Background 

Bellator 162 was headlined by the return of former middleweight champion Alexander Shlemenko for the first time in approximately 18 months, as he takes on The Ultimate Fighter 3 winner Kendall Grove. Shlemenko hadn't fought for Bellator since he knocked out Melvin Manhoef at Bellator 133 in February 2015. The former middleweight champ was suspended for three years by the California State Athletic Commission after failing a post-fight drug test for steroids. Shlemenko's suspension was reduced to one year, making him eligible to compete in February of this year. Shlemenko has fought twice in 2016 under the M-1 Challenge banner, scoring consecutive triumphs over Vyacheslav Vasilevsky. Grove has been victorious in three of his last four Bellator appearances, including back-to-back stoppages of Francisco France and Joey Beltran.

In the co-main event Bobby Lashley squared off with Josh Appelt. Lashley entered the cage on a seven-fight winning streak, while Appelt returned to Bellator on the strength of back-to-back victories.

Kevin Ferguson Jr., the eldest son of the late Kimbo Slice, was scheduled to make his Bellator debut on this card against Rick Bing. However, the bout was cancelled due to Bing missing weight for the fight.

Results

Bellator 163

Bellator 163: McGeary vs. Davis was held on November 4, 2016 at the Mohegan Sun Arena  in Uncasville, Connecticut. The event aired live in prime time on Spike TV.

Background

In the main event, Liam McGeary put up his light heavyweight title in a long-awaited match up with top contender Phil Davis. This was McGeary's second title defense. McGeary won the title by defeating Emanuel Newton in a five-round unanimous decision at Bellator 134. He then defended the title against Tito Ortiz at Bellator 142. McGeary has been out of action for over a year due to a medial collateral ligament injury. Davis defeated former light heavy champion Emanuel Newton and Francis Carmont in a one-night tournament to earn the title shot. While waiting for McGeary to heal, Davis also defeated Muhammed Lawal at Bellator 154.

The scheduled co-main event of Marloes Coenen vs. Talita Nogueira was cancelled the day before the event when Talita failed to make weight. A welterweight bout between Paul Daley and Derek Anderson was also scrapped on the day of the event after Daley fell ill from effects of his weight cut. Additionally, a catchweight bout at 160 pounds between Keenan Raymond and Kastroit Xhema was cancelled when Raymond withdrew from the fight.

The preliminary card featured the Bellator debut of Vinicius De Jesus. It also featured the professional MMA debuts of former standout wrestlers Ed Ruth and Tyrell Fortune. Ruth was a three-time NCAA Division I champion for Penn State, while Fortune won an NCAA Division II title for Grand Canyon.

Results

Bellator 164

Bellator 164: Koreshkov vs. Lima 2 was held on November 10, 2016 at the Menora Mivtachim Arena in Tel Aviv, Israel. The event aired on Spike TV on tape delay.

Background 

The event was headlined by two of the world's top Welterweights. Bellator champion Andrey Koreshkov met former champion Bellator Douglas Lima in a rematch in the main event. Koreshkov won the welterweight title with a unanimous decision victory over Lima at Bellator 140. He defended the belt earlier that year with a dominant win over former UFC lightweight champion Benson Henderson at Bellator 153. Lima won the vacant welterweight title with a second-round TKO of Rick Hawn at Bellator 117. After a lengthy layoff, he fought Koreshkov and lost via unanimous decision. After his loss to Koreshkov, he was out for a full year, but came back in July to defeat Paul Daley at Bellator 158.

In addition, the card featured one of Israel's own in the co-headliner, when newly signed Bellator MMA featherweight and Israeli Army veteran Noad Lahat met NCAA Division II All-American Scott Cleve, defeating him via a rear naked choke.

Results

Bellator 165

Bellator 165: Chandler vs. Henderson was held on November 19, 2016 at the SAP Center in San Jose, California. The event aired live in prime time on Spike TV.

Background 

The event was headlined by two of the world's top lightweights as two-time Bellator champion Michael Chandler met former World Extreme Cagefighting and UFC champion Benson Henderson. Chandler looked to defend his belt for the first time since defeating Patricky Freire via knockout at Bellator 157: Dynamite 2. A 15-fight veteran of Bellator MMA, Chandler has collected memorable wins at 155-pounds including a victory over former UFC lightweight champion Eddie Alvarez. Henderson earned a title shot in the lightweight division against its current titleholder in Chandler after defeating Patricio Freire at Bellator 160.

Results

Bellator 166

Bellator 166: Dantas vs. Warren 2 was held on December 2, 2016 at the WinStar World Casino in Thackerville, Oklahoma. The event aired live in prime time on Spike TV.

Background

The event was headlined by a title fight rematch as Eduardo Dantas defended the Bellator Bantamweight Championship against former champion Joe Warren. Dantas had won back to back fights since losing the Bellator bantamweight title to Warren at Bellator 128 in 2014. Warren was coming off a submission win against Sirwan Kakai at Bellator 161.

A fight between featherweight prospects A.J. McKee and Emmanuel Sanchez was scheduled for the co-main event. However, Sanchez pulled out in late November due to injury and was replaced by Ray Wood. Wood had been scheduled to face Treston Thomison on the preliminary card so Thomison received a new opponent in Dawond Pickney.

Results

Bellator 167

Bellator 167: Caldwell vs. Taimanglo 2 was held on December 3, 2016 at the WinStar World Casino in Thackerville, Oklahoma. The event aired live in prime time on Spike TV.

Background

Bellator 167 was originally scheduled to be headlined by a rematch between Patricky Freire and Derek Campos. The pair previously fought at Bellator 117 with Freire winning by TKO in the second round. However, on November 25, it was announced that Freire pulled out of the bout due to injury.

Bellator 167 was instead headlined by a bantamweight fight pitting Darrion Caldwell against Joe Taimanglo. Caldwell and Taimanglo previously met in a catchweight bout at Bellator 159. Caldwell did well in the first two rounds, but was caught with a fight-ending guillotine choke nine seconds into the third round. The defeat was the first loss of Caldwell's career and Caldwell was a 14-1 favorite entering the bout, making the upset the fourth biggest in MMA history. Taimanglo was riding a four-fight winning streak into the rematch. Caldwell came into the first bout with Taimanglo off a career-best win over Joe Warren at Bellator 151.

A featherweight bout between Pat Curran and John Teixeira was also scheduled for this card. However, the fight was cancelled in early November due to an injury sustained by Curran. Teixeira instead faced Justin Lawrence.

Results

Bellator 168

Bellator 168: Sakara vs Beltran will be held on December 10, 2016 at the Nelson Mandela Forum in Florence, Italy. The event will air live in prime time on Spike TV.

Background

In the main event, Alessio Sakara faces Joey Beltran. Sakara made his Bellator debut earlier this year at the first Bellator event in Italy and defeated Brian Rogers by knockout in the second round.

The event was originally expected to be headlined by a rematch between Rafael Carvalho and Melvin Manhoef for the Bellator Middleweight Championship. The pair previously fought at Bellator 155 with Carvalho retaining his title due to a controversial split decision. Bellator announcer Jimmy Smith called it one of the worst decisions he had ever seen in the promotion; likewise 5 of 5 media outlets scored the bout in favor of Manhoef. However, on December 2, Carvalho pulled out of the match due to injury.

The event will also feature Bellator Kickboxing bouts including an anticipated female flyweight rematch between Denise Kielholtz and Gloria Peritore, the woman who defeated her this past June. The bout will be for the inaugural Bellator Kickboxing Women's Flyweight World Championship.

Results

Bellator 169

Bellator 169: King Mo vs Ishii was held on December 16, 2016 at the 3Arena in Dublin, Ireland. The event aired live in prime time on Spike TV.

Background

The event was headlined by a heavyweight bout between former Strikeforce Light Heavyweight Champion and Rizin Heavyweight Grand Prix Champion Muhammed Lawal and Japanese Olympic gold medalist Satoshi Ishii. Lawal won the two-night, eight-man tournament at Rizin Fighting Federation on New Year's Eve in Japan. A 2008 Olympic gold medalist in judo, Ishii began his MMA career in December 2009 and made his Bellator debut in June 2016 against Quinton Jackson at Bellator 157: Dynamite 2.

Bellator 169 is a Bellator MMA and BAMMA co-promoted event with the BAMMA 27 show filling out the rest of the card. Several top Irish prospects including Dylan Tuke, Ryan Curtis, Rhys McKee, and James Gallagher were featured on the card.

Results

References

External links
Bellator

2016 in mixed martial arts
Bellator MMA events